Het or HET may refer to:

Science and technology
 Hall-effect thruster, a type of ion thruster used for spacecraft propulsion
 Heavy Equipment Transporter, a vehicle in the US Army's Heavy Equipment Transport System
 Hobby–Eberly Telescope, an instrument at the University of Texas McDonald Observatory
 Human enhancement Technologies, devices for enhancing the abilities of human beings
 Heterozygote, a diploid organism with differing alleles at a genetic locus; see zygosity
 Hexaethyl tetraphosphate, in chemistry
 HET acid, alternate term for Chlorendic acid

Other uses
 Hét, a village in Hungary
 Het peoples, or their language
 Heterosexuality, sexual attraction to the opposite sex
 HighEnd Teen (2008–2017), a former Indonesian magazine
 Historical Enquiries Team (2005–2014), a former unit of the Police Service of Northern Ireland
 Holocaust Educational Trust, a British charity
 HET, IATA code for Hohhot Baita International Airport, in Inner Mongolia, China
 HET, former ticker symbol for Harrah's Entertainment, later renamed Caesars Entertainment Corporation, an American hotel and casino corporation
 HET, initialism for Hoofdklasse, Eerste klasse, Tweede klasse, the three divisions of Football in the Netherlands
 Heth, a letter of many Semitic alphabets
Cyrillic spelling of the Russian word for no, pronounced "Nyet"

See also
 Hat (disambiguation)
 Heth (disambiguation)
 Hets (disambiguation)
 Hett (disambiguation)